Ronny Ackermann (born 16 May 1977 in Bad Salzungen, Bezirk Suhl) is a German former Nordic combined skier.

Ackermann started to learn to ski when he was five years old and took up ski-jumping two years later. As of 2004, he belongs to the team of Rhöner WSV Dermbach. His many successes include winning the Nordic combined World Cup in 2002, 2003 and 2008.

Ackermann found success in the FIS Nordic World Ski Championships, winning ten medals, including four golds (15 km individual: 2003, 2005, 2007; 7.5 km sprint: 2005), five silvers (7.5 km sprint: 2003, 4 x 5 km team: 2003, 2005, 2007, 2009), and a bronze (7.5 km sprint: 2001.) He also has won three silvers at the Winter Olympics in the sprint (2002) and team (2002, 2006) events. Ackermann is the first person to win the 15 km individual World Championships three straight times and the first to do it at the World Championships or Winter Olympic level since fellow German Ulrich Wehling did it during the Winter Olympics of 1972, 1976, 1980.

Ackermann has also won the Nordic combined event at the Holmenkollen ski festival three times, with 2 wins in the individual competition (2002, 2004) and a win in the sprint competition (2003). In 2003, Ackermann received the Holmenkollen medal (shared with Felix Gottwald).

He was elected Sportler des Jahres (Sportsman of the Year) in 2005.

References
 
 Holmenkollen medalists - click Holmenkollmedaljen for downloadable pdf file 
 Holmenkollen winners since 1892 - click Vinnere for downloadable pdf file 

1977 births
Living people
People from Bad Salzungen
People from Bezirk Suhl
German male Nordic combined skiers
Sportspeople from Thuringia
Olympic Nordic combined skiers of Germany
Nordic combined skiers at the 1998 Winter Olympics
Nordic combined skiers at the 2002 Winter Olympics
Nordic combined skiers at the 2006 Winter Olympics
Holmenkollen medalists
Holmenkollen Ski Festival winners
Olympic silver medalists for Germany
Nordic combined Grand Prix winners
Olympic medalists in Nordic combined
FIS Nordic World Ski Championships medalists in Nordic combined
Medalists at the 2006 Winter Olympics
Medalists at the 2002 Winter Olympics